HMS Redoubtable was a 74-gun third rate ship of the line of the Royal Navy, launched on 26 January 1815 at Woolwich.

Redoubtable was broken up in 1841.

Notes

References

Lavery, Brian (2003) The Ship of the Line - Volume 1: The development of the battlefleet 1650-1850. Conway Maritime Press. .

External links
 

Ships of the line of the Royal Navy
Vengeur-class ships of the line
1815 ships